This List of tallest buildings in Ohio ranks the forty tallest high-rise buildings by height within the state of Ohio. Ohio's twenty-four tallest buildings are all located in Ohio's three largest cities: Columbus (Central Ohio), Cleveland (Northeast Ohio), and Cincinnati (Southwest Ohio).

Tallest buildings under construction or proposed

See also
List of tallest buildings in Akron
List of tallest buildings in Cincinnati
List of tallest buildings in Cleveland
List of tallest buildings in Columbus
List of tallest buildings in Dayton
List of tallest buildings in Toledo

References

 
Ohio
Tallest